Asclettin or Aschettin (Latin: Asclettinus, Asclittinus, Aschetinus, Italianised as Asclettino, Asclittino, or Ascontino), Archdeacon of Catania (1145 – 1156) and chancellor of Sicily (March or April 1155 – before April 1156), was an Italo-Norman officer serving William I of Sicily. 

In 1156, he was imprisoned in Palermo for treason.

References

Sources
 The history of the tyrants of Sicily by "Hugo Falcandus," 1154-69. By Ugo Falcando, G. A. Loud, Thomas E. J. Wiedemann. Manchester University Press, 1998. 
 The administration of the Norman kingdom of Sicily. By Hiroshi Takayama. Brill, 1993. 
 Norwich, John Julius. The Kingdom in the Sun, 1130-1194. Longmans. London, 1970. 

Archdeacons
Italo-Normans
Norman warriors
12th-century Italian Roman Catholic priests
12th-century deaths
Year of birth unknown